Killer Inside: The Mind of Aaron Hernandez is a 2020 American true crime documentary series about convicted murderer and former professional American football player Aaron Hernandez. The three-part documentary explores his conviction for the murder of Odin Lloyd, other murder cases in which he was a suspect, and the factors in his life that shaped his behavior. It premiered on Netflix on January 15, 2020.

Premise
Friends, officials, attorneys, journalists, and former teammates discuss the rise, fall, and eventual suicide of professional football player Aaron Hernandez (1989–2017), who was sentenced to life in prison after his conviction for the 2013 murder of Odin Lloyd.

Production
In January 2017, director Geno McDermott  met with journalists Dan Wetzel and Kevin Armstrong, who had both covered Hernandez's trial for the murder of Odin Lloyd and were writing a book about Hernandez. They began gathering interviews and other research for the documentary. After a year and a half, McDermott originally compiled a documentary film, My Perfect World: The Aaron Hernandez Story, that was shown at the DOC NYC film festival, but decided to make it a series after partnering with Netflix.

Information about Hernandez's sexuality was not included in the original film, as it was unsubstantiated. McDermott spent several days interviewing Dennis SanSoucie and his father for the documentary. They began investigating CTE following Hernandez's death, when his autopsy revealed a "severe" case of the degenerative brain disease. After Hernandez died by suicide,  McDermott filed a FOIA request to obtain recordings of Hernandez's phone calls from jail and prison.

Hernandez's immediate family "very respectfully" declined to participate.

Episodes

Reception

Controversy
Attorney Jose Baez, who successfully defended Hernandez in his second murder trial, strongly criticized the documentary for including audio and photos of Hernandez's young daughter, Avielle. He also said too much time was spent discussing Hernandez's sexuality. Baez was interviewed for the documentary but said he regretted taking part.

Critical response
Killer Inside has received mostly positive reviews from critics. On Rotten Tomatoes, the series holds an approval rating of 75% based on 12 reviews, with an average rating of 7/10. The site's critical consensus reads: "Though it can't help but feel a little incomplete given the circumstances, The Killer Inside crafts a compelling overview of a series of tragic events." On Metacritic, the series has a weighted average score of 75 out of 100, based on 4 critics, indicating "generally favorable reviews".

Bob Hohler of  The Boston Globe called it a "gripping look" at Hernandez's downfall, writing, "The finest video documentary yet on the Hernandez tragedy, Killer Inside is richly enhanced by archival footage."

Brian Lowry of CNN wrote that there are too many variables to provide a conclusive explanation for Hernandez's downfall, but praised the insight provided by his phone calls from prison, writing, "In terms of the presentation, the most illuminating wrinkle in Killer Inside involves having access to audio of phone calls Hernandez made from prison, providing modest insight about his post-arrest state of mind and relationships with those closest to him."

Ashlie D. Stevens of Salon praised the series for putting CTE in the spotlight, writing, "But perhaps more captivatingly, Killer Inside takes an objective look at chronic traumatic encephalopathy (CTE) – a neurodegenerative disease caused by head injuries – and how that changes or inhibits brain function and impulse control."

References

External links 
 
  
  Killer Inside on Rotten Tomatoes 

2020 American television series debuts
2020 American television series endings
2020s American documentary television series
English-language Netflix original programming
Documentaries about LGBT topics
Netflix original documentary television series
True crime television series
Documentary television series about sports